José Luís Pereira Carneiro (born 4 October 1971) is a Portuguese politician from the Socialist Party.

Political career 
He has been Minister of Internal Administration in the XXIII Constitutional Government of Portugal since 30 March 2022.

References 

Living people
1971 births
21st-century Portuguese politicians

Socialist Party (Portugal) politicians
Lusíada University of Porto alumni
Government ministers of Portugal